Fife Lake can refer to:

 Fife Lake, Michigan, a village in Michigan, United States
 Fife Lake (Michigan), a lake in Michigan, United States
 Fife Lake Township, Michigan, Michigan, United States
 Fife Lake, Saskatchewan, a hamlet in Saskatchewan, Canada
 Fife Lake (Saskatchewan), a lake in Saskatchewan, Canada

See also 

 Fife (disambiguation)